The First Hogan Ministry was the 45th ministry of the Government of Victoria. It was led by the Premier of Victoria, Edmond Hogan, and consisted of members of the Labor Party. The ministry was sworn in on 20 May 1927.

Portfolios

References

Victoria (Australia) ministries
Australian Labor Party ministries in Victoria (Australia)
Ministries of George V